Kamenka is a rural locality (a selo) in Solonetskoye Rural Settlement, Vorobyovsky District, Voronezh Oblast, Russia. The population was 307 as of 2010. There are 7 streets.

Geography 
Kamenka is located 25 km west of Vorobyovka (the district's administrative centre) by road. Solontsy is the nearest rural locality.

References 

Rural localities in Vorobyovsky District